Murray was a fifty-five foot motorboat, part of the Maryland State Fishery Force, owned by the Conservation Commission of Maryland operating out of River Springs, Maryland, a landing in St. Mary's county, in the charge of Deputy Commander M. R. Bailey. The boat was built in 1915 by Chance Marine Construction Company at Annapolis, Maryland. Though Murray was given the Section Patrol number (SP-1438) while serving both the Conservation Commission and Navy during World War I there is no mention in the Navy records of a commissioned status.

The Navy approached the Conservation Commission shortly after the nation's entry into World War I proposing the commission's boats be used to maintain constant local patrols. The state legislature agreed that the boats and men of the state force would become part of the U.S. Naval Reserve providing they patrol the same districts for fisheries enforcement as well as federal interests with the benefit that patrol time would be increased and the expense for all be paid by the federal government.   The Maryland State Fishery Force boats began operating under a contract in which they were under a free lease to the United States Navy in August 1917, serving as Squadron Number 8 of the 5th Naval District, patrolling their regular areas enforcing state conservation law and federal laws. They were under the command of a Conservation Commission member, George O. Haddaway, who was also a Lieutenant in the Navy and expenses, wages, supplies and repairs were paid by the federal government.

Murray was returned to the Conservation Commission on 26 November 1918. The boat was noted as not being in good condition on return and assigned to the Potomac District by the Conservation Commission.

Footnotes

References

Other Maryland Fishery Force vessels
Bessie Jones, Buck, Daisy Archer, [[USS Dorothy (SP-1289)| Dorothy]], Frolic, Julia Hamilton,  Helen Baughman, Murray'', Music, Nellie Jackson, Nettie,  Severn, St. Mary's, and Swan

External links
 Photo: Power Boat Murray
 NavSource Online: Section Patrol Craft Photo Archive Murray (SP 1438)

1915 ships
Ships built in Annapolis, Maryland
Maritime history of Maryland
Chesapeake Bay boats
Patrol vessels of the United States Navy
World War I patrol vessels of the United States